John Edward Childe-Freeman, usually known during his playing career as John Freeman (born 28 June 1935 in Brisbane) is a former cricketer for Queensland who played 28 matches of first-class cricket between 1956 and 1962.

A leg-spin bowler, Childe-Freeman had his best season in the Sheffield Shield in 1956–57, taking 23 wickets at an average of 34.04 and forming a leg-spinning partnership with Wal Walmsley (who took 28 wickets at 28.39) that helped Queensland achieve second place at the end of the season. He took his best figures of 6 for 134 in the second match of the season, against Western Australia, after taking 5 for 77 against New South Wales in the first match.

References

External links

1935 births
Living people
Australian cricketers
Queensland cricketers
Cricketers from Brisbane